Jamal Willis (born 1972) is a local level leader in the Church of Jesus Christ of Latter-day Saints and a former NFL football player. He also works in administration for the Alpine School District in Utah.

Willis was born in Oklahoma. He attended BYU on a football scholarship and joined the Church of Jesus Christ of Latter-day Saints while a student there.

On January 7, 2018 Willis was called as a counselor in the Genesis Group presidency. Like all other members of the presidency, Willis is of African descent. He had not even previously attended the Group, but had been invited to attend while a student at BYU before he joined the LDS Church.

Willis has in the past been the football coach for Payson High School. He currently works as an administrator, evidently for Alpine School District over schools in Saratoga Springs, Utah.

Sources
NFL bio of Willis

Specific

1972 births
Living people
African-American Latter Day Saints
Latter Day Saints from Utah
Converts to Mormonism
BYU Cougars football players
San Francisco 49ers players
Latter Day Saints from Oklahoma
People from Saratoga Springs, Utah